The 2000–01 PGA Tour of Australasia was a series of men's professional golf events played mainly in Australia and New Zealand. The events were played during the calendar years of 2000 and 2001.

The Order of Merit was won by rookie Aaron Baddeley, who won twice during the season including a successful defence of the Holden Australian Open title, which he had won as an amateur in 1999.

Schedule
The following table lists official events during the 2000–01 season.

Order of Merit
The Order of Merit was based on prize money won during the season, calculated in Australian dollars.

Awards

Source:

Development Tour
The following table lists Development Tour events during the 2001 season.

Order of Merit
The Order of Merit was based on prize money won during the season, calculated in Australian dollars.

Notes

References

External links

PGA Tour of Australasia
Australasia
Australasia
PGA Tour of Australasia
PGA Tour of Australasia
PGA Tour of Australasia
PGA Tour of Australasia